The 1988 Hardy Cup was the 1988 edition of the Canadian intermediate senior ice hockey championship.

Final
Best of 7
Campbellton 5 Quesnel 1
Campbellton 7 Quesnel 5
Campbellton 7 Quesnel 5
Campbellton 7 Quesnel 3
Campbellton Tigers beat Quesnel Kangaroos 4-0 on series.

External links
Hockey Canada

Hardy Cup
Hardy